Gytis Paulauskas (born 27 September 1999) is a Lithuanian footballer who plays as a forward for Egnatia Rrogozhinë and the Lithuania national team.

Career
Paulauskas made his international debut for Lithuania on 7 October 2020 in a friendly match against Estonia.

Career statistics

International

References

External links
 
 Gytis Paulauskas at Lithuanian Football Federation

1999 births
Living people
Footballers from Vilnius
Lithuanian footballers
Lithuania under-21 international footballers
Lithuania international footballers
Association football forwards
FK Žalgiris players
FC Vilniaus Vytis players
FK Riteriai players
A Lyga players
I Lyga players